Henna railway station is located in the town of Orimattila, Finland, in the district of Henna. It is located along the Kerava–Lahti railway, and its neighboring stations are Lahti in the north and Mäntsälä in the south.

History 
In 2012, the town of Orimattila and the Finnish Transport Infrastructure Agency signed a letter of intent as well as a planning agreement about the possibility of building a new halt in the town district of Henna. In the long term, the town plans to develop Henna into an urban area with accommodation for around 2,300–5,500 jobs ja 6,400–15,400 residents.

The station was opened on 12 October 2017, and an official inauguration ceremony was held on the same day, in which Minister of Transportation and Communications Anne Berner was present. The new halt increased the travel time of commuter trains between Lahti and Helsinki by approximately 3 minutes, with minimal effects on freight train schedules. As of 2019, the station served under 100 passengers daily.

Services 

Henna is served by VR commuter rail line  on the route Helsinki–Lahti. During rush hours, the route extends further eastwards to Kouvola: two Z trains depart from Kouvola in the morning and return there in the evening rush hour. This service is also operated once in the direction Helsinki–Kouvola at midnight. Southbound trains toward  Helsinki use track 1, while northbound trains toward Lahti and Kouvola use track 4. Tracks 2 and 3 have no platforms and are only used by long-distance trains that pass through the station.

External links 
 
 Train departures and arrivals at Henna on Finrail

References 

Orimattila
Railway stations in Päijät-Häme
Railway stations opened in 2017